Beate Schmidt (born Wolfgang Schmidt on 5 October 1966) is a German serial killer. From October 1989 to April 1991, Schmidt, a transgender woman, murdered five women and an infant.

Early life
Schmidt was born Wolfgang Schmidt on 5 October 1966 in Lehnin, Brandenburg.

Murders
Schmidt murdered five women and a three month old baby:
 Edeltraut Nixdorf, 51, killed on 24 October 1989.
 Christa Naujoks, 45, raped and strangled to death on 24 May 1990.
 Inge Fischer, 34, raped and stabbed to death on 13 March 1991 in Beelitz.
 Tamara Petrowskaja, 44, strangled to death on 22 March 1991. Schmidt struck her son against a tree stump.
 Talita Bremer, 66, strangled to death on 5 April 1991 and her corpse was raped.

The nickname the Pink Giant came from both the killer's size and alleged penchant for pink lingerie. The area where some of the crimes took place led to a second and third moniker, the "Beast of Beelitz" and "Beelitz-Murderer".

On 1 August 1991 Schmidt was arrested after two men found Schmidt masturbating while wearing a bra under a jacket. Schmidt was sentenced to 15 years in prison and detention in a psychiatric hospital in Brandenburg an der Havel.

21st century
An application for a name change to Beate Schmidt was met by the court in 2001. Since 2009 Schmidt has undergone a hormone treatment for gender reassignment. In 2010, Schmidt was investigated for raping and causing another transgender inmate to attempt suicide.

See also

 List of German serial killers

References

1966 births
20th-century German criminals
Criminals from Brandenburg
German female serial killers
German people convicted of murder
German rapists
Living people
Necrophiles
People convicted of murder by Germany
People from Bezirk Potsdam
People from Potsdam-Mittelmark
Transgender women